L'Heureux is a surname of French origin. People with that name include:

Bob L'Heureux (born 1940), American politician 
Christine L'Heureux (fl. c. 1997), Canadian author and publisher
Claire L'Heureux-Dubé (born 1927), Canadian judge 
Élise L'Heureux (1827–1896), Canadian photographer 
Gaston L'Heureux (1943–2011), Canadian journalist and TV host
Ginette L'Heureux (fl. from 1986), Canadian administrator and politician 
John L'Heureux (1934–2019), American author
Justine L'Heureux (born 1989), Canadian speed skater
Patrice L'Heureux (1972–2018), Canadian boxer
Philippe Lheureux, moon landing conspiracy theorist
Sonia L'Heureux, Parliamentary Librarian of Canada 2012–2018
Yvon L'Heureux (1914–1984), Canadian politician 
Zachary L'Heureux (born 2003), Canadian ice hockey player

See also

Saint-Martin-l'Heureux, a place in France
 L'Heureux, French frigate on which Charles Edward Stuart escaped after the failure of the Jacobite rising of 1745

Surnames of French origin